Ekram is an Indian Bollywood drama film, written and directed by Saheem Khan.

Cast
 Saheem Khan as Ekram Siddiqui
 Sakshi lathaik as Nafeesha
 Asit Redij as Officer Randeep Singh
 Arshad Khan
 Sharat Sonu as Ishtiyaq Siddiqui

Plot
The film is about a young college student who is picked up by a police team during a tense situation following a terrorist attack in the capital Delhi. The film revolves around the life of this young man named Ekram Siddiqui, when he is convicted for a terrorist attack and kept in jail for ten years before being acquitted in court.

Production
This film has been shot in Delhi, Mumbai and Aligarh in Uttar Pradesh (India).

Soundtrack 

The music of the film is composed by Aslam Keyi and sung by singers like Master Saleem, Altamash Faridi and Mohammad Imran Pratapgarhi.

Release
The film is going to be released in India in coming month of 2020.

References

External links
 EKRAM Movie
 

2018 films
2018 romantic drama films
2010s Hindi-language films
Films set in Mumbai
Indian romantic drama films
Films set in Delhi